Manuel Ibarburu (20 February 1937 – 22 September 2021) was a Spanish rower. He competed in the men's eight event at the 1960 Summer Olympics.

References

1937 births
2021 deaths
Spanish male rowers
Olympic rowers of Spain
Rowers at the 1960 Summer Olympics
Sportspeople from San Sebastián
Rowers from the Basque Country (autonomous community)